Gūwalgiya was one of the most powerful Manchu clans. It is often listed by historians as the first of the eight prominent Manchu clans of the Qing dynasty. After the demise of the dynasty, some of its descendants sinicized their clan name to the Han Chinese surname Guan (關).

Notable figures

Males
 Fiongdon (1562–1620), close associate of Nurhaci
 Huisai (d. 1651), Fiongdon's grandson
 Fuzhen (d. 1909), Huisai's descendant
 Oboi (1610–1669), Fiongdon's nephew; served as one of the Four Regents of the Kangxi Emperor
 Nardu (d. 1676), Oboi's nephew
 Bahai (d. 1696), early Qing dynasty general
 Wenxiang (1818–1876), late Qing dynasty statesman
 Ronglu (1836–1903), late Qing dynasty mandarin, major confidant of Empress Dowager Cixi
 Guan Xiangying (1902–1946), Communist fighter, leader of the Communist Youth League of China
 Kwan Shan (1933–2012), Hong Kong actor
 John Kuan (born 1940), Kuomintang politician in Taiwan

 Prince Consort

Females
 Rosamund Kwan (born 1962), Hong Kong entertainer
 Kathy Chow (born 1966), Hong Kong actress
 Guan Xiaotong (born 1997), Chinese actress

Imperial Consort
 Imperial Noble Consort
 Hanjiuchun, Imperial Noble Consort Dunyi (1683–1768), the Kangxi Emperor's consort, the mother of 18th daughter (1701)

 Imperial Concubine
 Imperial Concubine Jian (d. 1780), the Jiaqing Emperor's concubine, the mother of first daughter (1780–1783)
 Imperial Concubine An (1785–1837), the Jiaqing Emperor's first class female attendant

Princess Consort
 Primary Consort
 Šurhaci's fourth primary consort (d. 1623), the mother of Jasahatu (1589–1609), Princess (1590–1649), sixth daughter (b. 1595), Turan (1596–1614), seventh daughter (b. 1597), Jaisanggū (1598–1625), Nuomudai (1601–1613), eighth daughter (b. 1602), ninth daughter and tenth daughter (b. 1603)
 Šurhaci's seventh primary consort, the mother of Fiyanggū (1605–1644)
 Yunreng's primary consort (d. 1718), the mother of Princess (1697–1735)
 Yunxu's primary consort, the mother of second daughter (1716–1726)
 Mianyu's first primary consort (d. 1835), the mother of first son (1835)
 Mianyu's second primary consort (d. 1852), the mother of Yixiang (1849–1886)
 Yiwei's primary consort (d. 1827)
 Yixin's primary consort (1834–1880), the mother of Princess Rongshou (1854–1924), Zaicheng (1858–1885), second daughter (1860–1864) and Zaijun (1864–1866)
 Youlan (1884–1921), Zaifeng's primary consort, the mother of Puyi (1906–1967), Pujie (1907–1994), Yunying (1909–1925), Yunhe (1911–2001) and Yunying (1913–1992)

 Secondary Consort
 Fuquan's secondary consort, the mother of fourth daughter (1681 – 1682 or 1683), Baotai (1682–1730) and Baoshou (1684–1706)
 Yunki's secondary consort, the mother of Hongzhi (1700–1775), third son (1702–1707), Hong'ang (1705–1782), fifth son (1707) and fifth daughter (1708–1710)
 Yuntao's secondary consort, the mother of third daughter (1728)
 Yinxiang's secondary consort, the mother of Princess (1703–1776) and Hongchang (1706–1771)
 Yunxu's secondary consort, the mother of first daughter (1716–1717), first son (1718–1719), second son (1719–1720), third daughter (1722–1730), Lady (1722–1745), Hongqing (1724–1770), Hongshou (1727–1731) and fifth daughter (1729–1748)
 Yongzhang's secondary consort, the mother of Lady (1755–1777)

 Concubine
 Dodo's concubine, the mother of Bakedu (1640–1668)
 Dodo's concubine, the mother of Zhakedu (1644–1689)
 Hooge's concubine, the mother of first daughter (1631–1692)

See also
 List of Manchu clans

Manchu clans

Plain White Banner
Bordered Red Banner